Shah Khail Garhi is the village located in Mansehra,  Khyber Pakhtunkhwa, Pakistan.

See also 
 Peeran
 Maira Amjad Ali

References

Populated places in Mansehra District